The 1909/1910 People's Budget was a proposal of the Liberal government that introduced unprecedented taxes on the lands and incomes of Britain's wealthy to fund new social welfare programmes. It passed the House of Commons in 1909 but was blocked by the House of Lords for a year and became law in April 1910.

It was championed by the Chancellor of the Exchequer, David Lloyd George, and his young ally Winston Churchill, who was then President of the Board of Trade and a fellow Liberal; called the "Terrible Twins" by certain Conservative contemporaries.

William Manchester, one of Churchill's biographers, called the People's Budget a "revolutionary concept" because it was the first budget in British history with the expressed intent of redistributing wealth equally amongst the British population. It was a key issue of contention between the Liberal government and the Conservative-dominated House of Lords, leading to two general elections in 1910 and the enactment of the Parliament Act 1911.

Overview 
The Budget was introduced in the British Parliament by David Lloyd George on 29 April 1909. Lloyd George argued that the People's Budget would eliminate poverty, and commended it thus:

The budget included several proposed tax increases to fund the Liberal welfare reforms. Income tax was held at nine pence in the pound (9d, or 3.75%) on incomes less than £2,000, which was equivalent to roughly £225,000 in today's money—but a higher rate of one shilling (12d, or 5%) was proposed on incomes greater than £2,000, and an additional surcharge or supertax of 6d (a further 2.5%) was proposed on the amount by which incomes of £5,000, or more (approximately £566,000 today) exceeded £3,000 (£340,000 today approx.). An increase was also proposed in death duties and naval rearmament.

More controversially, the Budget also included a proposal for the introduction of complete land valuation and a 20% tax on increases in value when land changed hands. Land taxes were based on the ideas of the American tax reformer Henry George. This would have had a major effect on large landowners, and the Conservative-Unionist opposition, many of whom were large landowners, had had an overwhelming majority in the Lords since the Liberal split in 1886. Furthermore, the Conservatives believed that money should be raised through the introduction of tariffs on imports, which would benefit British industry and trade within the Empire, and raise revenue for social reforms at the same time; but this was also unpopular as it would have meant higher prices on imported food. According to economic theory, such tariffs would have been very beneficial for landowners, especially tariffs on agricultural produce, but the costs to ordinary consumers would have exceeded the gains to these landowners (see Corn Laws).

Constitutional stand-off 
The Northcliffe Press (who published both The Times and the Daily Mail) urged rejection of the budget to give tariff reform a chance. There were many public meetings, some of them organised by dukes, which portrayed the budget as the thin end of the socialist wedge. Lloyd George gave a speech at Newcastle upon Tyne in October 1909 in which he said that "a fully-equipped duke costs as much to keep up as two Dreadnoughts; and dukes are just as great a terror and they last longer". The Conservatives wanted to force an election by rejecting the budget.

The Lords were entitled by convention to reject but not to amend a money bill but had not rejected a budget for two centuries. Originally, the budget had included only annual renewals of existing taxes—any amendment to taxes was part of a separate Act. That ended in 1860 when the Lords rejected the repeal of paper duties, which would have benefited new cheaper newspapers aimed at men who hoped soon to be given the right to vote, at the expense of existing papers. From then on, all taxes were included in the Finance Bill, and no such bill had been rejected, including the controversial introduction of death duties by Sir William Harcourt in 1894.

Despite the King's private urgings for the budget to be passed to avoid a crisis, the House of Lords vetoed the new budget on 30 November 1909 although it clarified that it would pass the bill as soon as the Liberals obtained an electoral mandate for it. The Liberals countered by proposing to reduce the power of the Lords. That was the main issue of the general election in January 1910, setting the stage for a tremendous showdown, which Lloyd George relished.

Despite the heated rhetoric, opinion in the country was divided. The Unionists, with 47% of the votes, were outpolled by the Liberals and their allies from the Labour Party. The outcome was a hung parliament, with the Liberals relying on Labour and the Irish Parliamentary Party for their parliamentary majority. As the price for their continued support, the Irish nationalist MPs demanded measures to remove the Lords' veto so that they could no longer block Irish Home Rule. They even threatened to vote down the Budget in the House of Commons (Irish Nationalists favoured tariff reform and abhorred the planned increase in whisky duty) until Asquith pledged to introduce such measures.

As they had promised, the Lords accepted the Budget on 28 April 1910, but contention between the government and the Lords continued until the second general election in December 1910, when the Unionists were again outpolled by their combined opponents. The result was another hung parliament, with the Liberals again relying on Labour and the Irish Parliamentary Party. Nonetheless, the Lords passed the Parliament Act 1911 when faced with the threat, obtained from a narrowly-convinced new King (George V, Edward VII having died on 6 May 1910, seven days after the Budget was passed), that it would be acceptable to flood the House of Lords with hundreds of new Liberal Party peers to give that party a majority or a near-majority there.

See also 
 Budget League
 Budget Protest League
 The Land (song)
 Welfare state in the United Kingdom

Citations

General and cited references 
 
 Cross, Colin. The Liberals in Power, 1905–1914 (1963) pp. 101–111. online
 Gilbert, Bentley Brinkerhoff. "David Lloyd George: Land, The Budget, and Social Reform". American Historical Review 81.5 (1976): 1058–1066.
 Lee, Geoffrey. The People's Budget: An Edwardian Tragedy (Shepheard-Walwyn, 2008).
 
 Murray, Bruce K. "The Politics of the 'People's Budget'." Historical journal 16#3 (1973): 555–570. .
 
 Murray, Bruce K. "The Unionist Leaders and the rejection of the 'People's Budget', 1909." South African Historical Journal 8.1 (1976): 84–103.
 Watson, Steven. "The Budget and the Lords: the Crisis of 1909–11." History Today (1953) 3#4 pp. 240–248. online

External links
 From Hansard indexes:
 "Finance Bill" (references dated 1909-04-29 to 1911-03-02 are to the People's Budget)
 "Budget Resolution" 1909  1910
 The People's Budget and the Welfare State David Lloyd George Exhibition, National Library of Wales

1909 in British politics
1909 in economics
1910 government budgets
Peoples Budget
1910 in economics
Constitutional crises
History of taxation in the United Kingdom
Income tax in the United Kingdom
Land taxation
Political history of the United Kingdom
United Kingdom budgets
Welfare state in the United Kingdom
David Lloyd George
Winston Churchill